Dautzenberg is a surname.

 Johan Michiel Dautzenberg (1808–1869), a Belgian writer
 Philippe Dautzenberg (1849–1935), a Belgian malacologist
 Jens Dautzenberg (born 1974), a German sprinter
 , a French pulmonologist
 Leo Dautzenberg (1950-), a German politician
  (1939-), an Austrian politician
  (1921-2009), a German actor
 Jakob Dautzenberg (1897-1979), a German politician
  (1945-2005), a German harness racer
  (1934-), a German theologian
  (1967-), a Dutch writer
  (1769-1828), a German librarian, journalist and politician